Line 16 of the Guangzhou Metro is a planned rapid transit line in China. The line will connect Xintang and Lichengjie, 2 major areas with the strongest economy and largest population in the Zengcheng District. The line is planned to connect with Line 4 of Dongguan Rail Transit in the future.

Rolling stock 

Stations

References

16